James Sangala (born 20 August 1986) is a Malawian international footballer who plays as a defender.

Career
Sangala began his career in Malawi with MTL Wanderers, before playing in South Africa for Thanda Royal Zulu.

International career
He made his international debut in 2006.

External links

1986 births
Living people
Malawian footballers
Malawi international footballers
Association football defenders
2010 Africa Cup of Nations players
Malawian expatriate footballers
Expatriate footballers in Angola
Expatriate soccer players in South Africa
Expatriate footballers in Portugal
Expatriate footballers in Vietnam
C.D. Primeiro de Agosto players
S.L. Benfica (Luanda) players
Thanda Royal Zulu F.C. players